Greenvale is a station on the Long Island Rail Road's Oyster Bay Branch. The station is located off Helen Street, between Glen Cove Avenue and Glen Cove Road in Roslyn Harbor, New York.

History
Greenvale station was originally established by the Glen Cove Branch Rail Road on July 21, 1866, as "Week's station," a freight-only station primarily used for delivering milk. Passengers were briefly allowed at the station in 1875, and then again sometime during the 1880s. At some point, the station was renamed "Greenvale." The passenger station has never existed as anything else other than a sheltered platform. On May 17, 1891, it was demolished by a locomotive that collided with a horse whose hoof was stuck in the switching apparatus, resulting in both the death of the horse and two crew members. Eventually the station was replaced. New shelters were built on both sides of the tracks in 2000 on high-level platforms that were installed to make the station compliant with the Americans with Disabilities Act of 1990.

Station layout
This station has two high-level side platforms, each four cars long.

References

External links

Unofficial LIRR History Website
1937 Greenvale Station Photo
2000 Reconstruction
 Station from Google Maps Street View

Roslyn Harbor, New York
Long Island Rail Road stations in Nassau County, New York
Railway stations in the United States opened in 1866
1866 establishments in New York (state)